Lego Indiana Jones 2: The Adventure Continues is a 2009 action-adventure video game developed by Traveller's Tales and published by LucasArts. Based on the Indiana Jones franchise, it is the sequel to the 2008 video game Lego Indiana Jones: The Original Adventures. It was released for the Wii, Xbox 360, PlayStation 3, and Microsoft Windows; Feral Interactive published a version for Mac OS X in 2011. TT Fusion developed handheld versions for the Nintendo DS and PlayStation Portable.   

The game allows players to play through the first four Indiana Jones films (albeit with different scenes chosen for adaptation) including Indiana Jones and the Kingdom of the Crystal Skull, which was not included in the previous game. Lego Indiana Jones 2 gameplay differs in many different areas from the original. It has multiple open world hub worlds where levels are placed, changes character abilities, and implements an offline level creator and 'adventure creator', both of which can be used to create new experiences using previously seen content. The handheld version on the Nintendo DS and PlayStation Portable, although released under the same name, is different from the version available elsewhere, with varied gameplay and less content overall. 

The game, although a commercial success, received mixed reviews from critics who commended the level design and level creator features, while panning it for its "confusing" hub worlds and lack of online play at launch. It is generally seen as inferior to the original game.

Gameplay
Lego Indiana Jones 2: The Adventure Continues uses a third-person view and lets the player control a Lego figure in areas related to Indiana Jones movie scenes. Each movie in the franchise is contained in a "playset", with the exception of the Kingdom of the Crystal Skull, which is divided into three playsets. Each playset contains five story levels and a unique hub. These hubs are large maps based on locations from the films that function as directories to levels, contain puzzles, purchasable characters, and are traversable by purchasable vehicles. This differs from the original, which had a single hub (Barnett College) where levels could be accessed immediately. Playsets have four types of story levels: one with a boss battle against the movie's main antagonist, vehicular levels (in which the player needs to destroy vehicles using the player's own vehicle), levels where many waves of enemies need to be defeated, and general puzzle levels. Along with the main story levels in each playset, there are additional levels to be found in the hub world. The player can play the additional levels using vehicles and characters also found in the hub world. Vehicles available for purchase include: boats, planes, animals, and automobiles. The character roster contains more than 80 characters. To purchase these, the player can destroy Lego props or complete puzzles at hubs for money, called Studs.Lego Indiana Jones 2 features special abilities for characters to solve puzzles and defeat enemies with. For example, Indiana Jones can use his whip to attack enemies, tie enemies up, manipulate objects, or swing from the ceiling. There are also high-jumping characters, wrench-using characters, shovel-carrying characters, and gun-wielding characters.

Two-player co-op was changed from the original with split-screen; rather than forcing both characters to always be close enough to fit on the same screen, the game seamlessly splits when characters wander apart from one another and merge into one screen when both players are near each other. On 23 November 2009, LucasArts revealed on Twitter that it was working on a patch for the PlayStation 3 and Xbox 360 versions of the game which enabled online co-op gameplay, including for custom levels. 

Lego Indiana Jones 2 includes a level creator, the first Lego game to do so, where players can create their own levels using assets unlocked through progression through the game followed by purchase. These items include blocks, traps, animals, and programmable enemies. In this process, props and bricks are manually put down. This system can also be used in co-op. Similarly, there is an 'adventure creator' where players can change certain things about a pre-existing level to quickly create a custom level. A character creator is also included, although Lego Indiana Jones 2 is not the first Lego game to include the feature.

According to IGN, the game should take around 10 and a half hours to complete the story levels, and around 23 and a half to complete the entirety of the game.

Synopsis
The game is a humorous retelling of the first four Indiana Jones films: Raiders of the Lost Ark, Temple of Doom, The Last Crusade, and Kingdom of the Crystal Skull. The game's retellings also differ from the original films. For instance, they feature boss battles which are either not present or dissimilar to that which is present in the films. Entrance to the story levels also prompts cutscenes, which explain prior events and lend context to the scene unfolding.

Because the first game already adapted the first three films, they are not as prominently featured in the sequel, and their stories were heavily modified to include new scenes and omit others. As a result, the length to complete the missions for the first three films is much shorter than in the previous game. The fourth film, however, is divided into 3 playsets, adding up to a completion length, with regards to the story levels, closer to the real film's.

Marketing and release 
Lego Indiana Jones 2: The Adventure Continues was developed by Traveller's Tales and TT Fusion. The game's development happened primarily in August and September 2009, and 35,000 man-hours were spent play testing the game. Its existence was leaked by accident in March when it was discovered that an animator's publicly visible résumé stated that she had worked "as a Cutscene Animator on LEGO Harry Potter & LEGO Indiana Jones 2: The Kingdom of the Crystal Skull which are both in the early stages of production." The portfolio also alluded to Lego The Hobbit. Although removed shortly after discovery, the leak was not acknowledged by Traveller's Tales, who only announced the game on May 29, when it was said by LucasArts that the game would offer a 'a tongue-in-cheek take on all four cinematic adventures of pop culture's most iconic archaeologist'. The announcement also made reference to the feature of building custom levels. Game footage was shown off at E3, then the game demoed at Legoland Windsor for the LEGO Indiana Jones Fireworks Extravaganza in October 2009. It was then released to North American markets on 17 November 2009, European markets on 20 November, and Australian markets on 25 November. Feral Interactive distributed the game for Mac worldwide on 2 April 2011.

Reception

On announcement, the game was the subject of skepticism regarding similarity to the original. It was believed that adding another film, the critically disliked Kingdom of the Crystal Skull, would not justify making another game after such a short break, as the previous game released only the previous year.

On release, the game generally received mixed reviews. GameTrailers deemed it more repetitive than previous titles and criticized a lack of online features to complement the co-op and level editor modes. They also criticized the fact that half the game was based on what they considered the worst film in the series. However, Tom McShea of GameSpot suggested that the "roll-your-eyes nature of the film" found a much better fit in the Lego game adaptation. Chris Roper of IGN lamented the lack of secrets in the main levels as well as the disorganized hub worlds, but praised the soundtrack and lasting appeal. Brian Crescente of Kotaku, however, said the game delivered on many levels and recommended it over the first game. Roper and Crescente commended it for not staying onto the details of the movies and instead focusing on humor, a feature that was present in its predecessor, although Richard Cobbett of GamesRadar+ noted that the final bosses were especially unlike the contents of the films. According to Roper, the choice to use different scenes than the original in levels can render the plots incomprehensible for people who had not seen the movies. Matt Miller of Game Informer proclaimed the graphics to be the best of any preceding Lego game due to its color and increased focus on animations. However, Robert VerBruggen of Cheat Code Central criticized how radically different the game's cutscenes are to gameplay in terms of visuals, as well as how stark the realistic backgrounds are relative to Lego elements.

The inclusion of a level creator was praised by critics. Dan Whitehead of Eurogamer described it as "powerful" and that the menus, although a bit "fiddly", were relatively easy to use. However, Miller and The Guardians Neil Davey noted that the creation of a level is a tedious process on the basis that the user is required to place down elements piece by piece. Because Lego Indiana Jones 2 did not contain online functionality at launch, McShea criticized the inclusion of the level creation feature at all. Regarding this perceived redundancy, Roper said "most everyone who buys LEGO Indy 2 will never play content created by another user, despite it including a built-in level creator, and that's a major problem."

References

2009 video games
3D platform games
Action-adventure games
Feral Interactive games
Games for Windows certified games
Indiana Jones and the Last Crusade games
Indiana Jones and the Temple of Doom games
Indiana Jones video games
Indiana Jones 2: The Adventure Continues
LucasArts games
MacOS games
Multiplayer and single-player video games
PlayStation 3 games
Raiders of the Lost Ark games
Split-screen multiplayer games
Traveller's Tales games
Video game sequels
Video games developed in the United Kingdom
Video games scored by David Whittaker
Video games set in Austria
Video games set in Berlin
Video games set in Brazil
Video games set in Connecticut
Video games set in Egypt
Video games set in India
Video games set in Nepal
Video games set in Nevada
Video games set in Peru
Video games set in Shanghai
Video games set in Turkey
Video games set in Venice
Wii games
Windows games
Xbox 360 games